Vivian Trías (Las Piedras, Uruguay, 30 May 1922 – 24 November 1980) was a Uruguayan historian and politician, belonging to the Socialist Party of Uruguay.

He was a secret agent of the Czechoslovak Státní bezpečnost (StB).

References 

1922 births
1980 deaths
People from Las Piedras, Uruguay
20th-century Uruguayan historians
Uruguayan socialists
People of the StB
Uruguayan spies